Joe Seliga (11 April 1911 – 18 December 2005) was a master builder of wood-and-canvas canoes in Ely, Minnesota.

Joe Seliga was born to Steve and Anna (Vasko) Seliga in Ely, Minnesota and graduated from Ely Memorial High School.
Seliga was inspired by the Morris canoes, which were built by B.N. Morris Canoe Company of Veazie, Maine from 1887 to 1920. As a child, Seliga's family owned two Morris canoes, a 15-foot and an 18-foot. His first experience in canoe construction came when his family's 18-foot canoe was severely damaged, requiring twenty-one new ribs and a new cover. Seliga built his first canoe form and completed his first canoe in 1938, which he immediately sold.

Seliga built canoes from before World War II until his death at the age of 94, only stopping from 1942 to 1945, when he was forced to work as a miner. He worked in the Zenith Mine and at Reserve Mining. Over his career, he built 621 canoes, 237 of which were sold to the YMCA and church camps which used the Boundary Waters Canoe Area Wilderness and Quetico Provincial Park.

Seliga's wife, Nora, also assisted in building canoes.

In Jerry Stelmok's book, The Art of the Canoe with Joe Seliga, Sam Cook's foreword reads in part:

On February 4, 1994, a fire destroyed Seliga's shop. However, by that September, he had begun building canoes again.

Seliga sold many canoes to Camp Widjiwagan, the St. Paul, Minnesota YMCA camp, outside Ely.  Upon his death, Camp Widjiwagan received Seliga's canoe form.

In the early 2000s, Bell Canoe Works began manufacturing the 'Bell Seliga', a Kevlar canoe based on the Seliga form.

References

External links
 Joe Seliga article (PDF)
 Joe Seliga's Canoe
 Joe Seliga
 Seliga Canoe Enthusiasts
 Morris canoes

American boat builders
American woodworkers
1911 births
2005 deaths
People from Ely, Minnesota